Zoë Isabella Kravitz (born December 1, 1988) is an American model, actress, singer, and film-maker. She made her acting debut in the romantic comedy film No Reservations (2007). Her breakthrough came with portraying Angel Salvadore in the superhero film X-Men: First Class (2011), which earned her nominations for a Teen Choice Award and a Scream Award. She rose to prominence playing Christina in The Divergent Series (2014–2016) and Leta Lestrange in the Fantastic Beasts film series (2016–2022).

Kravitz earned praise for her lead roles in the HBO drama series Big Little Lies (2017–2019), which earned her a Screen Actors Guild Award nomination, and the Hulu romantic comedy series High Fidelity (2020). She appeared as Toast the Knowing in George Miller's Mad Max: Fury Road (2015), and has starred in numerous independent films including Dope (2015), Gemini (2017), and Kimi (2022). She voiced Mary Jane Watson in Spider-Man: Into the Spider-Verse (2018), and played Catwoman in the animated The Lego Batman Movie (2017) and the live-action DC film The Batman (2022), the latter earning her nominations for a Saturn Award among other accolades. She is set to make her directorial debut with Pussy Island, which she also co-wrote and co-produced.

Time magazine named Kravitz one of the 100 Most Influential People in 2022. She works as a fashion model and musician, and has starred in campaigns for Tiffany & Co., Vera Wang, Balenciaga, Alexander Wang, Coach New York, Tumi, and Calvin Klein. As of 2017, Kravitz is the face of YSL Beauté. She also fronts the band Lolawolf and released the albums Calm Down in 2014 and Tenderness in 2020.

Early life

Kravitz was born in Venice, Los Angeles at the home of her parents, actress Lisa Bonet and musician Lenny Kravitz. Both her parents are of half African-American and half-Jewish descent. Her paternal grandmother, actress Roxie Roker (a first cousin once removed of television weather forecaster Al Roker), and her maternal grandfather, Allen Bonet, were African American, with some of her grandmother's family being from The Bahamas. Her paternal grandfather, NBC television news producer Sy Kravitz, and maternal grandmother, Arlene Litman, were both Ashkenazi Jews. Kravitz's paternal grandfather's family emigrated from Ukraine. Kravitz identifies as a secular Jew.  The song "Flowers for Zoë", included on her father's second album Mama Said, was written as a tribute to the two-year-old Zoë.

Kravitz's parents married in 1987 and divorced six years later, in 1993, when Zoë was five years old. She lived with her mother in Topanga Canyon and then moved to Miami at age 11 to live with her father, spending summers with her mother. Kravitz has a younger half-sister, Lola Iolani Momoa, and a half-brother, Nakoa-Wolf Manakauapo Namakaeha Momoa, from her mother's second marriage to actor Jason Momoa. Her godfather is movie producer Bruce Cohen, and her godmothers are actresses Marisa Tomei and Cree Summer.

Kravitz attended Miami Country Day School and Rudolf Steiner School in Manhattan graduating in 2007. Kravitz began studying that year at the acting conservatory under Scott McCrea at the State University of New York at Purchase where her peers included Micah Stock and Jason Ralph. She left college after a year and moved to Brooklyn, New York to work in films. She struggled with anorexia and bulimia throughout high school, until around age 24.

Career

Early work and breakthrough (2008–2012) 

Kravitz landed her first film role while in high school, playing a babysitter hired by Catherine Zeta-Jones's character in the 2007 romantic comedy No Reservations. In the same year she also appeared in the action thriller The Brave One. In 2008, Kravitz appeared in the music video for Jay Z's "I Know" and was featured singing in will.i.am's music video for "We Are the Ones", in support of US presidential candidate Barack Obama. That same year she also appeared in the family drama Birds of America and neo noir comedy Assassination of a High School President. She began making music at the age of 16. She fronted the New York/Philadelphia-based band Elevator Fight, which she formed in 2009. The band performed at the South by Southwest music festival and on the main stage of the Roots Picnic in Philadelphia in June 2009, along with The Roots, TV On The Radio, and The Black Keys. Kravitz stated in 2011 that her music is a hobby. She also performed with the cabaret troupe The Citizens Band.

In 2009, Kravitz co-starred in the independent ensemble drama The Greatest, in which her character is addicted to grief counseling groups. Also in 2009, she was named the face of Vera Wang's Princess fragrance in 2009, appearing on the website and in advertisements for the brand. In 2010, she appeared in It's Kind of a Funny Story. Also that year, Kravitz appeared in Twelve. Kravitz next starred in the romantic comedy Beware the Gonzo as the female lead and love interest of Ezra Miller's eponymous Gonzo. Kravitz was featured in a campaign for fashion designer Alexander Wang in 2010.

In 2011, Kravitz appeared in the coming-of-age film Yelling to the Sky. She also appeared in eight episodes of the Showtime television series Californication, in which she portrayed Pearl, the vocalist of the all-female band Queens of Dogtown. That same year she portrayed the comic book character Angel Salvadore in X-Men: First Class. Kravitz filmed her scenes in London and performed wire work for her role, to simulate her character's ability to fly. In late 2011, Kravitz completed work on a film with the working title Treading Water, which was eventually released in 2013, renamed The Boy Who Smells Like Fish. In the same year, she represented Vera Wang's new Preppy Princess fragrance.

Rise to prominence and expansion (2013–present) 
In 2013, she co-starred in After Earth. In 2013, Kravitz released a jewelry line in collaboration with the Swarovski crystal company. She used ethnic and vintage jewelry, and her birthstone, Turquoise, as inspiration for her designs. In 2014, she portrayed the character Christina in Divergent. Kravitz reprised her role in the sequels Insurgent and Allegiant. Also in 2014, she starred in the independent drama The Road Within and the romantic comedy Pretend We're Kissing. Kravitz started the band Lolawolf while in Los Angeles filming The Road Within. Made up of members from the band Reputante, Lolawolf released an eponymous EP and debuted at the Mercury Lounge in November 2013. The band was named after Kravitz's younger siblings, Lola and Nakoa-Wolf. They released their debut album, Calm Down, on October 21, 2014, and supported Lily Allen, Miley Cyrus, and Warpaint on tour in 2014. The band released the five-track EP, Every Fuckin Day, on June 23, 2015.

Kravitz appeared in 2014's Good Kill. In 2015, she appeared in the comedy-drama Dope and in Mad Max: Fury Road. In 2016, she co-starred in the action thriller Vincent N Roxxy and appeared in the independent film Adam Green's Aladdin. Kravitz also had a role in the Harry Potter spin-off Fantastic Beasts and Where to Find Them as Leta Lestrange. In 2017, Kravitz starred in the mystery thriller Gemini. In the same year, she appeared in the comedy film Rough Night and the animated superhero film The Lego Batman Movie, in which she voiced the comic book character Selina Kyle / Catwoman. She also became the face of Brooklyn-based designer Alexis Bittar's jewelry line in 2015.

From 2017 to 2019, Kravitz starred in the HBO drama series Big Little Lies, in which she portrays Bonnie Carlson; for her performance, she earned two Black Reel Award nominations as well as a nomination for the Screen Actors Guild Award for Outstanding Performance by a Cast in a Drama Series. Kravitz appeared in the 2018 science fiction action film Kin and reprised her role as Leta Lestrange in Fantastic Beasts: The Crimes of Grindelwald, in a larger capacity. Also in 2018, she appeared on BBC Children in Need with Eddie Redmayne, setting up Alex Jones from The One Show, with the help of children who fed them the answers to the interview questions. Kravitz was ranked one of the best dressed women in 2018 by fashion website Net-a-Porter. In the same year, Kravitz was featured on the song "Screwed" on Janelle Monáe's album Dirty Computer. She was also featured on "Anti-Social Smokers Club" on Rae Sremmurd's third album SR3MM.

In 2019, Kravitz was cast as the lead in the Hulu romantic comedy television series High Fidelity, based on the 2000 film of the same name in which her mother stars. The series premiered on Valentine's Day, 2020 to critical acclaim with Kravitz's performance as Rob Gorgan receiving praise. Margaret Lyons of The New York Times described her performance as "mesmerizing", adding "She's so good, in fact, that it's almost impossible to believe she can't find someone to love her exactly as-is." Alison Herman of The Ringer called Kravitz a "bona-fide leading lady". Despite the critical success, High Fidelity was cancelled after one season. For her role in the series, Kravitz won a Black Reel Award and was nominated for a Satellite Award. Also in 2020, she starred as one of the leads in Viena and the Fantomes.

Kravitz portrayed Selina Kyle / Catwoman, now in live action, in director Matt Reeves' The Batman, which was released on March 4, 2022, to critical and commercial success, grossing over $700 million internationally. Kravitz's performance received positive reviews. The Independent wrote that "Kravitz's Catwoman brings an almost-extinct sensuality to the role", and in Christy Lemire's review of the film—written for RogerEbert.com—she stated that "This is no flirty, purring Catwoman: She's a fighter and a survivor with a loyal heart and a strong sense of what's right. ... Kravitz continues to reveal a fierce charisma and quiet strength." She earned several award nominations for her performance, including the Saturn Award for Best Actress. Kravitz starred in filmmaker Steven Soderbergh's thriller Kimi, which was released to generally positive reviews with her performance receiving praise. 

In June 2021, Kravitz announced plans to make her directorial debut in Pussy Island, a film she also co-wrote. In August 2021, it was announced that Kravitz will star and serve as an executive producer on coming-of-age animated series Phatty Patty, bankrolled by Will Smith and Jada Pinkett Smith's Westbrook Studios. In June 2022, it was announced that Kravitz will star in and produce the heist thriller The Sundance Kid Might Have Some Regrets for Warner Bros.

Personal life
Kravitz lives in Williamsburg, Brooklyn.

She briefly dated Ezra Miller during filming on Beware the Gonzo and was in a relationship with actor Penn Badgley from 2011 to 2013.

In 2016, Kravitz began a relationship with actor Karl Glusman. They became engaged in February 2018, and were married at Kravitz's father's home in Paris on June 29, 2019. In December 2020, Kravitz filed for divorce, which was finalized in August 2021.

She was reported to be in a relationship with actor Channing Tatum in November 2022.

Filmography

Film

Television

Music videos

Discography

Awards and nominations

References

External links

 

1988 births
21st-century American actresses
Actresses from Los Angeles
African-American actresses
African-American female models
African-American Jews
African-American models
American female models
American film actresses
American people of Bahamian descent
American people of Ukrainian-Jewish descent
American television actresses
American voice actresses
American women in electronic music
Jewish American actresses
Jewish American musicians
Jewish female models
Lenny Kravitz
Living people
People from Williamsburg, Brooklyn
Secular Jews
State University of New York at Purchase alumni
Miami Country Day School alumni
African-American women musicians